David Garland may refer to:

David Garland (Gaelic footballer), Irish Gaelic footballer and umpire
David Garland (musician) (born 1954), singer-songwriter, composer, and radio personality
David E. Garland (born 1947), Dean of George W. Truett Theological Seminary
David S. Garland (1769–1841), U.S. Representative from Virginia
David W. Garland (born 1955), professor of law and sociology
David Siteman Garland, American author
David John Garland (1864–1939), Anglican clergyman in Queensland, Australia
David Garland (English footballer) (born 1948), English footballer